In the 1948 Isle of Man Tourist Trophy festival Harold Daniell, lap record holder since 1938, failed to finish the 1948 Senior TT on his Norton, and victory went to Norton team member, Artie Bell, the flying Ulsterman. Norton dominated, taking the first three places, losing fourth to Geoff Murdoch's AJS, and then filling the next four places. There were thirty three Nortons in a field of fifty six.

Artie Bell also came third in the Junior TT with Freddie Frith taking the flag for first place, and A. R. (Bob) Foster coming second, both on Velocettes. Maurice Cann won the Lightweight with his DOHC 250 cc Moto Guzzi, followed by Roland Pike on a Rudge.

Three Clubman races were again included, for the second year, in the festival with the Clubman Senior race allowing entires of bikes up to 1,000 cc engine capacity.

Later in 1948, at the FICM (later called FIM) meeting in London, it was decided there would be a motorcycle World Championship along Grand Prix lines. It would be a six-race annual series with points being awarded for a placing, and a point for the fastest lap of each race. There would be four classes: 500cc, 350cc, 250cc and 125cc. In the past a Grand Prix had been an individual race. In 1949 for the first time, starting with the Isle of Man TT, a series of Grand Prix races would decide who would be the 1949 World Champion.

The 1948 TT also saw the first presentation of the Jimmy Simpson Trophy, awarded to the rider who completed the fastest lap of the meeting.

Junior TT (350cc)

Lightweight TT (250cc)

Clubmans Senior TT

Clubmans Junior TT

Clubmans Lightweight TT

Senior TT (500cc)

References

External links
Detailed race results
Isle of Man TT winners

Isle of Man TT
1948
1948 in British motorsport